Mathieu Boulay (born November 23, 1987) is a former Canadian football defensive lineman. He played for the Saskatchewan Roughriders, Winnipeg Blue Bombers and Edmonton Eskimos. He played CIS football at Bishop's.

College career
Boulay was a member of the Bishop's Gaiters for four years from 2007 until 2010. He was named the team's lineman of the year his senior season, along with being recognized as the Defensive MVP. As well he was named Most Outstanding Defensive Lineman in the 2010 East-West Shrine Game. Despite his efforts, Boulay went undrafted in the 2011 CFL Draft.

Professional career

Saskatchewan Roughriders
Boulay signed a free agent deal with the Saskatchewan Roughriders in May, 2011.  He was released on June 25.

Montreal Alouettes
Boulay was signed by the Montreal Alouettes on June 1, 2013. He was released June 9, 2013.

Winnipeg Blue Bombers
Boulay signed with the Winnipeg Blue Bombers on July 22, 2013. In 5 games, he recorded 3 special teams tackle. He was released on January 31, 2014.

Edmonton Eskimos
Boulay signed with the Edmonton Eskimos on February 5, 2014. He recorded 4 special teams tackles.

Edmonton Eskimos 2015 :

Boulay recorded 14 special teams tackles, 4 Defensive tackles 1 sack. He also recorded two tackles and one forced fumble in playoffs

Personal life
Mathieu's brother Nicolas Boulay is also a professional football player in the Canadian Football League.

References

External links
 Edmonton Eskimos bio 
 CFL Player Profile
 Saskatchewan Roughriders Profile

1987 births
Living people
Bishop's Gaiters football players
Canadian football defensive linemen
Edmonton Elks players
Players of Canadian football from Quebec
Saskatchewan Roughriders players
Canadian football people from Montreal